Chronicon Lethrense (Danish: Lejrekrøniken English: Chronicle of Lejre/Leire) is a small Danish medieval work from the 12th century, written in Latin.

Themes
Unlike Chronicon Roskildense, which deals primarily with information presented as real historical facts after the introduction of Christianity in Denmark, Chronicon Lethrense is a recording of folklore about the old pre-Christian Danish kings and the adventure stories that were eventually associated with them. In that sense it is not much different from the first part of Sven Aggesøn's Brevis Historia Regum Dacie or Saxo Grammaticus' Gesta Danorum, though considerably smaller and of much lesser quality. It is sometimes referred to as the "Chronicle of the Kings of Lejre."

One of the noted aspects of Chronicon Lethrense is the writer's deep hatred of all things German, which at times takes on epic proportions. This German hatred can also be traced, although to a lesser degree, in Aggesøn's Brevis Historia Regum Dacie, and to a much lesser degree in Saxo's Gesta Danorum.  The second book of Saxo's Gesta Danorum, starting at Halfdan Scylding, through the fourth book, the reign of Dan II, is based on the genealogy of the Chronicon, though substantial additional mythical material has been used.

The original version of Chronicon Lethrense is certainly a work of its own. Its stories are interesting and over time copies found its way to other places; there was a copy in the fourteenth-century Latin Annals of the Cathedral of Lund. Because of this, Chronicon Lethrense is often connected to Annales Lundenses, of which it is now a part, but it is unlikely the chronicle was originally included in this anthology.

History
The chronicle is believed to have been composed in the second half of the 12th century, probably around 1170, and preceded the writing of the far more famous and verbose Gesta Danorum by Saxo, with which it shares many traditions not found in other sources. Either Chronicon Lethrense or a closely allied tradition appears to have been one of Saxo's many sources. The Gesta Danorum (not to be confused with Saxo's work of the same title) is a later text in East Norse (Old Danish) derived from the Chronicon Lethrense with corrections from other sources by, presumably, its translator according to Introduction to Old Norse (E. V. Gordon; A. R. Taylor, ed. Oxford University Press. 1957). The "Gesta" is the text translated by Peter Tunstall below; it is not technically the Chronicon Lethrense, which is in Latin.

Authorship
Although the author is unknown, there is some conjecture that he may have been a clerk tightly linked to the Roskilde Cathedral. This is based on the great interest the author has in the city of Roskilde, which he describes in vivid detail, chronicling how it got its name and promising immortality to the city through his writing.

References

Further read
 "Chronicon Lethrense," in Scriptores Minores Historiæ Danicæ, Vol. I, M. CL. Gertz, 1917–18, Copenhagen.
Lotte Fang  (1993)  Lejrekrøniken – en sagnkrønike (Kolorit) 
 The Chronicon Lethrense, as edited by M. Cl. Gertz, 1917 : djvu-file.
 "Gesta Danorum." (An excerpt from Codex Holm. B 77 collated with Codex Holm. C 67 from Gammeldanske Krøniker [Samfund g. n. Lit.], ed. M. Lorenzen [1887 - 1913]. Copenhagen.) Included in Gordon, E. V. and Taylor, A. R. (1957), An Introduction to Old Norse, 2nd edition. Oxford: Clarendon Press. Trans. Peter Tunstall (2003). Available here and translated at Peter Tunstall: The Chronicle of the Kings of Lejre and Northvegr: The Saga of Hrolf Kraki: The Chronicle of the Kings of Lejre.

12th-century Latin books
Danish chronicles
12th-century history books